Jencarlos Canela (born April 21, 1988) is an American actor and singer. Canela starred in the telenovela Mi corazón insiste en Lola Volcán, and two other telenovelas.

In September 2013, he began a new project called "Scan Me" on his official Vevo account with a series of YouTube videos showing behind the scenes clips as he and his collaborators created his new album.

Canela won Artist of the Year in the 2013 awards show Premios Juventud, and his song "I Love It" won the Song of the Summer award. In the 2014 Lo Nuestro Awards show, Canela's "I Love It" music video was nominated for Video of the Year.

Early life
Canela was born in Miami, Florida, to Cuban parents, Lisette and Heriberto Canela. He is the older brother of actor Jason Canela, and they also have two older siblings, Erick and Annette. Canela refused to follow his father's military footsteps and joined Disney Channel to pursue his dream of being the first Cuban Disney Singer.

Music career
At the age of 12, Canela began his musical career as the lead singer of the group "Boom Boom Pop". After two years of successful participation with the group, he decided to start his solo career in late 2002. Over the following five years, he appeared in several international events including the "Miss World" 2004 and 2005 beauty pageants, "The Latin Fiesta Festival" in Toronto, Canada, and "The CALLE OCHO Festival" in Miami. 
During this period, he continued his studies of music and acting at the New World School of the Arts (USA), from which he graduated with honors in May 2006.

Ford Motor Company chose Canela as model and singer for its "Ride it Like a Ford" ad campaign where he sang a jingle he'd written. This commercial was broadcast on television in the United States in 2006.

Canela's first two albums were produced by Rudy Pérez at his studio in Miami Beach under the independent label Bullseye Music Entertainment. His first album "Búscame" debuted at #2 in 2009, and in 2011 his second album "Un Nuevo Día" came in at #1 during the first week it was released.

In 2012, Canela, in collaboration with Emilio Estefan, recorded the song "Sueña" for Telemundo's coverage of the 2012 Summer Olympics. It was also to be the official song of Miss America 2013, but a contract dispute with Telemundo led to the song being replaced by "Don't Stop the Party" by Pitbull. In 2012, Canela signed with Universal Music Latin Entertainment.

Acting career
Canela made his acting debut in 2007 as Alfredo Torres in the hit telenovela Pecados Ajenos, in which he collaborated with Dominican singer Cristal Marie to create the theme song for the show. He then went on to appear in Doña Barbara in 2008.

In 2008, he debuted as a theater actor in the critically acclaimed stage musical Miami Libre at the Arsht center. Miami Libre narrates the dreams of a young Cuban who arrives in Miami with the intentions of being a singer, but for that to happen he will have to conquer a series of obstacles that make this work a true example of perseverance. In Miami Libre, Canela acted, performed songs and danced. The play was performed in both English and Spanish.

On January 16, 2009, Canela signed an exclusivity contract with Telemundo.
In 2009, Canela was the protagonist as Ángel Salvador in the telenovela Más sabe el diablo. Gaby Espino and Miguel Varoni also starred in the telenovela. In 2010, the movie Más Sabe el Diablo: El Primer Golpe was released, again with Canela, Gaby Espino, and Miguel Varoni.

In 2011, Canela began recording the telenovela Mi corazón insiste en Lola Volcán with Carmen Villalobos. In the Telemundo award show Premios Tu Mundo 2012, the telenovela won the award for Novela of the Year and Canela won the Favorite Lead Actor award.

Canela reappeared in 2013 in the new Telemundo telenovela Pasión prohibida with Mónica Spear. In that same year, the actor won as Favorite Lead Actor for the second time at Telemundo's award show Premios Tu Mundo 2013.

On December 7, 2015, Canela made his debut on English-language television starring in Eva Longoria's NBC show Telenovela.
In March 2016, Canela portrayed Jesus Christ in the musical special The Passion on Fox. In 2020, he played Uncle Victor in the Netflix series The Expanding Universe of Ashley Garcia.

Personal life
In September 2011, Canela and Gaby Espino (Venezuelan actress and model) did a live chat over the social networking site Twitter, where they confirmed they were in a relationship. They announced that they were expecting their first child together and their godparents would be Cristina Saralegui and Pitbull. Espino gave birth to their son, Nickolas Canela Espino, on February 12, 2012. On August 26, 2014, both Canela and Espino confirmed on their official Facebook pages that they were ending their relationship.

Filmography

Film

Television roles

Discography

Studio albums

Singles

Awards and nominations

References

External links
 
 

1988 births
Living people
American male film actors
American male telenovela actors
American male television actors
American people of Cuban descent
Hispanic and Latino American male actors
Universal Music Latin Entertainment artists
21st-century American male singers
21st-century American singers